USS Whale  has been the name of two ships in the United States Navy:

United States Navy ship names